St Michael's Church, also known as St Michael's and All Angels, is a former Church of England church in Paignton, Devon, England. Built in 1939, the church closed in 1979 and is now part of a residential development named St Michael's Court.

History
St Michael's was built to replace a temporary mission church of 1909, which was located at Elmbank Road and had 200 sittings. Owing to the dilapidated condition of the building and the need for improved church accommodation in the parish, the vicar of Paignton, Rev. B. Montague Dale, launched an appeal in February 1937 to raise £10,000 for the construction of two new, permanent churches. Construction of the first church, St George's at Goodrington, began after £5,000 had been raised in six months.

A plot of land for the proposed new church of St Michael was donated by Mr. Herbert Whitley of Primley and plans for the building drawn up by the ecclesiastical architects Messrs. Tonar and Drury of Exeter. Once the majority of the second £5,000 had been raised towards Rev. Dale's appeal, construction of St Michael's began in early 1939, although the foundation stone was not laid by the Bishop of Crediton, Rev. William Surtees, until 23 June 1939. It was constructed by Messrs. Willcocks and Barnes of Paignton for a cost of £6,000. The church was consecrated by the Bishop of Exeter, the Right Rev. Charles Curzon, on 2 December 1939.

St Michael's was declared redundant on 1 April 1979. It was sold the following year to Devon Community Housing Society Ltd and planning permission was approved to extend and convert the building for the creation of 35 flats. The church now forms part of St Michael's Court, a development offering sheltered and retired housing.

References

Buildings and structures in Paignton
Churches in Devon
Church of England church buildings in Devon
Churches completed in 1939